Betula chinensis, commonly known as dwarf small-leaf birch, is a species of birch that can be found in China and Korea on the elevation of .

Description
Flowers bloom from May to June while the fruits ripe from July to August.

Taxonomy
Betula chinensis occurs in both hexaploid and octoploid forms. It appears to be a triple hybrid between B. calcicola, B. potaninii and B. chichibuensis. It is placed in section Asperae, subgenus Aspera.

References

chinensis
Flora of China
Trees of Korea